John Roundhill is an Australian bishop in the Anglican Church of Australia. He has served as an assistant bishop of the Diocese of Brisbane  (Southern Region) since 2018.

Roundhill was a physics teacher in Belize before his ordination as a priest in 1994. Since then he has worked in Lancaster, Scotland, Hong Kong and Australia. Prior to being appointed as bishop, he served as rector of Aspley-Albany Creek, as an area dean, Archdeacon of Lilley and, from 2012 to 2018 as Dean of Bendigo.

References

21st-century Anglican bishops in Australia
Deans of Bendigo
Archdeacons of Lilley
Assistant bishops in the Anglican Diocese of Brisbane
Living people
Year of birth missing (living people)